Maikay Ki Yaad Na Aaye is a Pakistani drama soap that first aired on Geo Tv on 6 July 2016 (first day of Eid). It is produced by Babar Javed. It aired every Monday to Friday at 7:00 pm only on Geo Tv, but after 28 episodes, the soap was shifted to the 10:30pm slot as Mera Dard Bayzuban took its place.

Cast

Munawar Saeed 
Yasir Ali Khan as Ibad
Fariya Hassan as Shehzeena
Nida Mumtaz as Shah Sahab's wife
Anoushay Abbasi as Khazeena
Kanwar Nafees
Arez Ahmed as Subhan
Farah Nadir as Begum Rameen
Darzana Shafiq
Majida Hameed
Farzana Shafiq
Tauqeer Ahmed Paul as Hamad
Jahanara Hai as Fareeda Begum	
Kehkashan Faisal
Hafsa Butt

See also
 Geo TV
 List of programs broadcast by Geo Entertainment
 List of Pakistani television series

External links

 
A&B Entertainment
2016 Pakistani television series debuts